Ilmir Fanilyevich Yakupov (born 17 March 1994) is a Russian football player.

He made his professional debut in the Russian Football National League for FC Sibir Novosibirsk on 11 July 2015 in a game against FC Volgar Astrakhan.

References

External links
 Player page on the FNL website

1994 births
People from Ufimsky District
Living people
Russian footballers
FC Sibir Novosibirsk players
Association football forwards
FC Ufa players
FC Avangard Kursk players
Sportspeople from Bashkortostan